Camili is a village in the Mersin Province, Turkey. Administratively, it is part of Akdeniz district, which is an intracity district within Mersin city. The population of the village was 925
as of 2012. The village is northeast of the city center.

References

Villages in Akdeniz District